Cacyparis is a genus of moths in the family Nolidae erected by Francis Walker in 1863. It is found in throughout India, Sri Lanka, Myanmar, Papua New Guinea and Australia.

Description
Its palpi are upturned and the third joint is very long, slender and knobbed at the end. The antennae are fasciculate (bundled) in the male. Forewings are broad with acute apex. Veins 3 to 5 from near angle of cell, vein 6 from upper angle and vein 9 arising from vein 10 and anastomosing with vein 8 to form the areole. Hindwings with veins 3 and 4 from angle of cell, vein 5 above the angle, veins 6 and 7 from upper angle and vein 8 from before the middle of the cell.

Species
Cacyparis atrotumens Walker 1865
Cacyparis brevipennis Warren 1916
Cacyparis ceira Swinhoe 1901
Cacyparis cylcops Hampson 1905
Cacyparis elegans Butler 1887
Cacyparis hylaria Cramer 1779
Cacyparis insolitata Walker 1862
Cacyparis melanolitha Turner 1909
Cacyparis punctigera Linnaeus 1758
Cacyparis rectilineata Warren 1916
Cacyparis tenuipalpis Snellen 1880

References

External links

 "Cacyparis Walker 1862". Encyclopedia of Life. Retrieved January 13, 2019.

Nolidae